Raoul Charles, Baron Van Caenegem (14 July 1927 – 15 June 2018), was a Belgian historian and noted expert in the field of European legal history.

Biography
Raoul Van Caenegem was born in Ghent on 14 July 1927. He became a professor at the University of Ghent. In 1974, he was awarded the Francqui Prize in human sciences for his work on medieval history.

He studied the history of continental and English common law, and why they diverged so sharply. He revealed the significance of power struggles between the judiciary, legislators, and legal scholars. He wrote in Dutch and English, with some of his most notable works being translated into other European languages.

Van Caenegem became a foreign member of the Royal Netherlands Academy of Arts and Sciences in 1977. In 1995 he was awarded the title of baron ad personam. He died on 15 June 2018.

Family 
Van Caenegem was married to the British-born historian Patricia Carson, who was ennobled in 1996 with the personal title of Baroness.

Works
 "Foundations: c. 750-c. 1150, Government, Law & Society", in The Cambridge History of Medieval Political Thought, c. 350–1450, ed. J. H. Burns, Cambridge University Press, Cambridge, 1988.
 The Birth of the English Common Law, Cambridge University Press, Cambridge, 1973, 2nd edition 1988. 
 An Historical Introduction to Private Law, translated by D. E. L. Johnston, Cambridge University Press, Cambridge, 1992. 
 An Historical Introduction to Western Constitutional Law, Cambridge University Press, Cambridge, 1995

Literature
 G.R. Elton, Return to Essentials: Some Reflections on the Present State of Historical Studies, Cambridge University Press, 1991.
 Th. Denoël, Le nouveau dictionnaire des Belges, 1992
 S. Dauchy, J. Monballyu, A. Wijffels (eds.) Auctoritates. Xenia R.C. Van Caenegem oblata (De auteurs van de rechtsontwikkeling), Brussels, Paleis der Academiën, 2000.
 Oscar Coomans de Brachène, État présent de la noblesse belge, Annuaire 2002; Annuaire 2004

References

1927 births
2018 deaths
Barons of Belgium
Belgian medievalists
Academic staff of Ghent University
Legal historians
Members of the Royal Netherlands Academy of Arts and Sciences
Members of the Royal Flemish Academy of Belgium for Science and the Arts
Corresponding Fellows of the British Academy
Corresponding Fellows of the Medieval Academy of America
20th-century Belgian historians
People from Ghent